San Luis Municipal Museum is a museum located in Juana Romero avenue in San Luis, Pinar del Río, Cuba. It was established as a museum on 31 May 1982.

See also 
 List of museums in Cuba

References 

Museums in Cuba
Buildings and structures in Pinar del Río Province
Museums established in 1982
1982 establishments in Cuba
20th-century architecture in Cuba